Thomas Hussey may refer to:

Politicians
 Thomas Hussey (MP for Dorchester) (fl. 1395), English MP
Thomas Hussey (died 1558) (by 1509–1558), MP for Great Grimsby, Grantham and Lincolnshire
 Thomas Hussey (died by 1576) (c. 1520–by 1576), MP
 Thomas Hussey (died 1468), MP for Weymouth and Melcombe Regis, Great Bedwyn, Old Sarum and Dorset
 Sir Thomas Hussey, 2nd Baronet (1639–1706), English member of parliament
 Thomas Hussey (Aylesbury MP) (1749–1824), English MP
 Thomas Hussey (Grantham MP) (died 1641), Royalist Member of Parliament for Grantham, 1640–1641
 Thomas Hussey (Lyme Regis MP) (1814–1894), British Member of Parliament for Lyme Regis, 1842–1847
 Thomas Hussey (MP for Whitchurch) (1597–1657), English merchant and politician who sat in the House of Commons at various times between 1645 and 1657
 Thomas Hussey (Irish politician) (born 1936), former Fianna Fáil politician from County Galway in Ireland

Others
 Thomas Hussey (bishop) (1746–1803), Irish diplomat, chaplain and bishop
 Thomas John Hussey (1792–c. 1854), English clergyman and astronomer
 Tom Hussey (1910–1982), Major League Baseball announcer
 Tom Hussey (photographer), American photographer